Wendell William Eads (June 10, 1923 – June 5, 1997) was an American Thoroughbred horse racing jockey. In the early 1940s he was a contract jockey with the prestigious Calumet Farm. Small, even by jockey standards, Eads weighed just 102 pounds and as a result could not control Calumet's extremely high strung but talented colt, Whirlaway. The problem cost Eads the chance to make history aboard Whirlaway who won the 1941 United States Triple Crown of Thoroughbred Racing.

During his career, Wendell Eads won a number of important races including the Blue Grass Stakes and the Pimlico Special. As well, he competed in two of the American Classic Races. He was aboard Sun Again for a third-place finish in the 1942 Preakness Stakes and rode Dove Pie to a seventh-place finish in the 1943 Kentucky Derby

Following his retirement from racing, Wendell Eads made his home in Oakland, Illinois where he was living at the time of his death in 1997.

References
 Vaccar, Mike. 1941 -- The Greatest Year in Sports (2007) Doubleday 
 November 4, 1991 Sports Illustrated article on Whirlaway and Wendell Eads

1923 births
1997 deaths
American jockeys
People from Oakland, Illinois